Wouter Gösgens (born 31 August 1998 in Voorburg, South Holland, Netherlands) is a Dutch curler from Zoetermeer. He currently skips the Dutch men's curling team.

Teams

Grand Slam record

References

External links

2017 Spotlight on: Netherlands | Ford World Men’s Curling Championship | EYE OPENER – SUNDAY, APRIL 2, 2017 (page 7)
Video: 

Living people
1998 births
Sportspeople from Voorburg
Dutch male curlers

Sportspeople from South Holland
People from Zoetermeer
21st-century Dutch people